The Death of Gaia is the sixth album by Officium Triste, released in 2019 by Transcending Obscurity Records.

Track listing
  "The End Is Nigh"   – 7:24
  "World in Flames"   – 6:09
  "Shackles"   – 7:48
  "A House in a Field in the Eye of the Storm"   – 2:24 
  "The Guilt"   – 7:42
  "Just Smoke and Mirrors"   – 6:56
  "Like a Flower in the Desert"   – 7:19
  "Losing Ground"   – 10:20

Personnel
 Pim Blankenstein – vocals
 William van Dijk – rhythm guitar
 Martin Kwakernaak – keyboards
 Niels Jordaan – drums
 Gerard de Jong – lead guitar
 Theo Plaisier – bass guitar

References 

Officium Triste albums
2019 albums